Donald William McKay (born 7 August 1937) is a former New Zealand rugby union player. A wing, McKay represented  at a provincial level, and was a member of the New Zealand national side, the All Blacks, from 1961 to 1963. He played 12 matches for the All Blacks including five internationals.

References

1937 births
Living people
Rugby union players from Auckland
People educated at Takapuna Grammar School
New Zealand rugby union players
New Zealand international rugby union players
Auckland rugby union players
Rugby union wings